Wuhe is a town under the administration of Guangning County, Guangdong, China. , it administers Wuhe Residential Community and the following six villages:
Xiayuan Village
Jiangbu Village
Zhuangyuan Village
Zhenyuan Village
Henggang Village
Cunxin Village

References 

Township-level divisions of Guangdong
Guangning County